The Citrus Series is the name given to the interleague series between the Miami Marlins and Tampa Bay Rays in Major League Baseball. The first meeting between the two teams took place on June 22, 1998 at Tropicana Field in St. Petersburg, Florida during the Rays' inaugural season. Beginning with the  season, when the Marlins are the home team games are played at LoanDepot Park, formerly known as Marlins Park until the  season.

Currently, because the Marlins play in the National League, and the Rays in the American League, the only possible postseason matchup the teams can have is in the World Series, though this has never happened. Both teams have had appearances in the Fall Classic, however. The Marlins have won both of their World Series appearances in 1997 and 2003, while the Rays lost both of their  appearances in 2008 and 2020.

Former Rays manager Joe Maddon said he did not consider the Citrus Series a true rivalry. "I really don't honestly believe the fans see it as being a rivalry, I really don't. The best way to get that done is to include us in the same league or the same division. That might stir something up."

Weeks after the Marlins concluded a characteristic fire sale that brought in less expensive players such as Yunel Escobar from the Toronto Blue Jays, the Marlins traded Escobar to the Rays for minor leaguer Derek Dietrich.

Currently, the two teams play each other four times each season. During seasons in which the interleague schedule division rotation matches up the teams' two divisions, six games are played between them. Prior to 2013, six games were always played, with the exception of 1998 and 2003.

Series year-by-year results

References

See also
Lightning–Panthers rivalry
Buccaneers–Dolphins rivalry
Heat-Magic rivalry
Fort Lauderdale–Tampa Bay rivalry

Recurring sporting events established in 1998
Major League Baseball rivalries
Baseball in Florida
Miami Marlins
Tampa Bay Rays
Interleague play
1998 establishments in Florida
Sports rivalries in Florida
Annual events in Major League Baseball